Andreassi is an Italian surname. Notable people with the surname include:

 Ippolito Andreassi, O.S.B. (1581–1646), Roman Catholic prelate who served as Bishop of Terni
 Raffaele Andreassi (1924–2008), Italian film director
 Scott J. Andreassi, District Attorney of Armstrong County, Pennsylvania 

Italian-language surnames
Patronymic surnames
Surnames from given names